Michael John Estocin (April 27, 1931 – April 26, 1967 (presumed)) was a United States Navy officer and a recipient of the United States military's highest decoration—the Medal of Honor—for his actions in the Vietnam War.

Biography
Estocin was born on April 27, 1931 in Turtle Creek, Pennsylvania,. He graduated from Slippery Rock State Teachers College in 1954.

Military career
Estocin entered the Naval Aviation Cadet program on June 11, 1954, and was commissioned in September 1955.

Vietnam War
On that day, he supported a bombing mission over Haiphong, North Vietnam.

April 26 mission
Six days later, on April 26, he supported another strike aimed at Haiphong's thermal power station, with John B. Nichols acting as his escort in an F-8 Crusader. Estocin and Nichols flew ahead of the main attack and were charged with suppressing any surface-to-air missiles (SAMs) in the area. The strike on the power plant went without incident, and the two pilots were about to head back to the Ticonderoga when Estocin detected an active SAM site. A single missile was launched from the site and exploded near his A-4, knocking it into a barrel roll. Estocin was able to regain control and pulled the aircraft, burning at the belly and wing roots, into a 30 degree dive.

Estocin's wingman, John Nichols, immediately called for a helicopter rescue. He flew beside the stricken plane, getting close enough to see Estocin in the cockpit with his head bent forward slightly, not moving. He tried to contact Estocin by radio but received no response. As the A-4 lost altitude and entered a cloud bank, Nichols continued to follow it, even as a second SAM exploded nearby. After reaching , he leveled off and watched as Estocin's plane fired its remaining Shrike missiles and impacted with the ground. He circled the area, looking for a parachute, but saw nothing. Nichols called off the rescue mission and returned to the Ticonderoga.

Although Nichols was certain Estocin had been killed in the crash, intelligence from Hanoi indicated that he had ejected and been captured. The U.S. military declared him a prisoner of war, causing Nichols to feel deep guilt for having called off the rescue mission. When the prisoners were released in 1973 and Estocin was not among them, it was presumed that he had died in captivity.

In 1993, a committee investigating the cases of missing U.S. military personnel concluded that Estocin was never captured and had indeed died in the crash of his plane. Estocin's disappearance and presumed death occurred one day before his 36th birthday. A marker in his memory was placed in Fort Rosecrans National Cemetery, San Diego, California.

Awards and honors
For his actions during the missions over Haiphong on April 20, and April 26, 1967, Estocin was promoted to captain in absentia and awarded the Medal of Honor. In 1976, his parents ran him as a write-in candidate for President of the United States to bring attention to prisoner of war/missing in action issues. The U.S. Navy named the guided missile frigate , launched in 1979, in his honor.

The Michael J. Estocin Award was created by the U.S. Navy to recognize meritorious achievement by a strike fighter squadron. The award, originally sponsored by the McDonnell Douglas corporation, is a trophy with a polished black stone base and an 18-inch (46 cm) stainless steel ribbon topped with a stylized model of a strike fighter aircraft. It is awarded annually to the strike fighter squadron with the greatest professional reputation, aggressiveness, and operational performance.

Medal of Honor citation
Captain Estocin's official Medal of Honor citation reads:
For conspicuous gallantry and intrepidity at the risk of his life above and beyond the call of duty on 20 and 26 April 1967 as a pilot in Attack Squadron 192, embarked in USS Ticonderoga (CVA-14). Leading a 3-plane group of aircraft in support of a coordinated strike against two thermal power plants in Haiphong, North Vietnam, on 20 April 1967, Capt. Estocin provided continuous warnings to the strike group leaders of the surface-to-air missile (SAM) threats, and personally neutralized 3 SAM sites. Although his aircraft was severely damaged by an exploding missile, he reentered the target area and relentlessly prosecuted a SHRIKE attack in the face of intense antiaircraft fire. With less than 5 minutes of fuel remaining he departed the target area and commenced in-flight refueling which continued for over 100 miles. Three miles aft of Ticonderoga, and without enough fuel for a second approach, he disengaged from the tanker and executed a precise approach to a fiery arrested landing. On 26 April 1967, in support of a coordinated strike against the vital fuel facilities in Haiphong, he led an attack on a threatening SAM site, during which his aircraft was seriously damaged by an exploding SAM; nevertheless, he regained control of his burning aircraft and courageously launched his SHRIKE missiles before departing the area. By his inspiring courage and unswerving devotion to duty in the face of grave personal danger, Captain Estocin upheld the highest traditions of the U.S. Naval Service.

See also

List of Medal of Honor recipients for the Vietnam War
List of people who disappeared

References

1931 births
1960s missing person cases
1967 deaths
Aerial disappearances of military personnel in action
American military personnel killed in the Vietnam War
American people of Slovak descent
Aviators killed by being shot down
Burials at Fort Rosecrans National Cemetery
Military personnel from Pennsylvania
Military personnel missing in action
Missing aviators
Missing person cases in Vietnam
People from Turtle Creek, Pennsylvania
United States Navy captains
United States Navy Medal of Honor recipients
United States Navy personnel of the Vietnam War
Vietnam War recipients of the Medal of Honor